Coleophora virgaureae is a moth of the family Coleophoridae. It is found from most of Europe (except the Balkan Peninsula) through the Caucasus, Kazakhstan and Siberia eastward to the Baikal area and the Altai in Russia and Japan.

The wingspan is 11–13 mm. Adults are on wing from August to September.

The larvae feed on European goldenrod (Solidago virgaurea) and sea aster (Aster tripolium).

References

virgaureae
Moths described in 1857
Moths of Asia
Moths of Europe
Taxa named by Henry Tibbats Stainton